Mickey's Magical World is a 1988 home video compilation from Walt Disney Home Video, originally released on May 31, 1988 as part of the Walt Disney Mini-Classics series, in honor to celebrate Mickey Mouse's 60th anniversary. Jiminy Cricket hosted this compilation with clips from the following Disney animated shorts:
 Thru the Mirror (1936)
 The Worm Turns (1937)
 Lonesome Ghosts (1937)
 The Band Concert (1935)
 Gulliver Mickey (1934) (colorized version)
 Magician Mickey (1937)
 The Sorcerer's Apprentice (1940) (from Fantasia)

In between the cartoon short clips featuring Mickey Mouse, clips from This is Your Life, Donald Duck, Pinocchio, Orphan's Benefit, The Mickey Mouse Club and From All of Us to All of You are also used.

The VHS counterpart of this compilation was re-issued in 1991, and remained in stock until the early 2000s.

References

External links
 

1988 direct-to-video films
Disney direct-to-video animated films
Mickey Mouse films
1980s American animated films
Short film compilations
1988 animated films
1988 films
1980s English-language films